Conny Klack, born 1940, is a Swedish footballer who played in Sandvikens IF before being transferred to GIF Sundsvall. He was a strong full-back and a part of the team that took GIF Sundsvall to the Swedish premier division in 1965. After his years in GIF Sundsvall, he played for local rival IFK Sundsvall.

References

External links 
Picture of Conny Klack at GIF Sundsvall

Swedish footballers
1940 births
Living people

Association football defenders